India has been a heavy user of revenue stamps, both before and after independence. The first revenues were issued in the mid-nineteenth century and they are still being issued to this day. Apart from issues for the whole of India, many princely states, provinces and other states also had or still have their own revenue stamp issues.

Before independence
Before independence, Indian revenue stamps were closely modelled on similar designs from Great Britain, often using a key type design. Key types were used for several types of revenue, including:
Agreement
Broker's Note
Consular
Custodian's Fee
Entertainments (special issues for Bengal, Bombay and the United Provinces)
Foreign Bill
High Court Notarial
Insurance
Notarial
Revenue (Bombay only)
Share Transfer
Small Cause Court (Calcutta only)
Special Adhesive (including overprints for Vakil)

Some taxes, however, had special stamps, and these were:
Central Excise
Court Fees (including issues for Copies and Service)
Customs
Foreign Bill
Forest Department
High Court (including issues for Advocate, Attorney and Notarial)
Insurance Agent Licence Fee
Match Tax
Notarial
Petition
Postal Note
Postal Service
Revenue (or Receipt)
Share Transfer
Small Cause Court (including special issues for Calcutta and Madras)
Special Adhesive (including overprints for Vakil)
Tobacco Excise

In addition, numerous revenue stamps of unique designs were issued by the Princely States of India.

After independence

After in
dependence, Indian revenue stamps changed to include the Lion Capital of Asoka but still using a key type format. Various different designs of keytypes were used, with the latest one being from around 2007 to this day. Keytypes were used for the following purposes: 
Agreement
Broker's Note
Consular
Custodian's Fee
Foreign Bill
High Court Notarial
Insurance
Notarial
Share Transfer
Small Cause Court (Calcutta only)
Special Adhesive
Of these, Insurance, Notarial, Special Adhesive as well as some others are still in use.

Special stamps were also used for several other purposes. These were:
Broadcasting Radio Licence Fee
Central Excise
Central Recruitment Fee
Customs
Foreign Travel Tax (formerly Passenger Service Fee)
Insurance
Match Tax
Passport
Revenue
Social Security
Tobacco Excise

State issues

At least 300 Indian princely states issued their own revenue stamps. Most of these stopped having separate revenues as they were dissolved after independence, however some states such as Jaipur and Sikkim continued to do so until the 1960s as they became states of independent India. The state of Jammu and Kashmir still has its own revenue stamps to this day due to its special status in article 370 of the Indian constitution. Some other states which were created after independence such as Assam and Madhya Bharat also issued stamps.

Meanwhile, many revenue issues both before and after independence exist with provincial or state overprints. Overprints are known from about 75 different states.

Stamped paper and hundis

India has been a very heavy user of stamped paper, both before and after independence.

In addition, hundis, an alternative money transmission system widely used in the Indian sub-continent, often bear a pre-printed revenue stamp.

French and Portuguese India
French India had separate revenue stamps until 1954. After it became part of India, Pondicherry issued several revenues. Initially French India stamps were surcharged in Indian currency, and later separate stamps were issued inscribed either Timbre Mobile or Timbre Quittance. Later Pondicherry overprinted Indian revenues with the name of the state, anna stamps were used before and after independence denominations like 2annas,which will be gradually become part of revenue, later denominations like 10rs and 20rs in late '70s profusely but the introduction of these stamps in 1978 and later, higher denominations like 50rs and 100rs were having the highest capability in revenue and duties later and this continued to the 1980.

Portuguese India also issued its own revenues. In 1954, Dadra and Nagar Haveli was liberated from Portuguese India and it issued a single revenue stamp. After the liberation of Goa in 1961, Portuguese Indian revenues were overprinted with new values in Indian currency for use as Court Fee or Revenue stamps. Later various Indian revenues were overprinted "Goa, Daman & Diu" for use in the former Portuguese territories. This continued until the 1970s.

See also
Postage stamps and postal history of India
Revenue stamps of Bangladesh
Revenue stamps of Pakistan

References

Further reading

Koeppel, Adolph. The Court Fee and Revenue Stamps of the Princely States of India: An Encyclopedia and Reference Manual, Volume I, The Adhesive Stamps, Fiscal Philatelic Foundation, New York,  1983. . (With Raymond D. Manners)
Koeppel, Adolph. The Court Fee and Revenue Stamps of the Princely States of India: An Encyclopedia and Reference Manual, Volume I, The Adhesive Stamps, Supplement),  Fiscal Philatelic Foundation, New York,  1986. . (With Raymond D. Manners)
Koeppel, Adolph. The Court Fee and Revenue Stamps of the Princely States of India (The Stamped Paper Including Second Adhesive Stamp Supplement Volume II), Fiscal Philatelic Foundation, New York, 1989. . (With Raymond D. Manners)

External links

India States Revenues
Heritage of Indian Stamps blog
India's One Anna Receipt Stamps of Queen Victoria and King Edward: 1860-1906 Exhibit by Steven Zwillinger
Indian Court Fee Issue of 1904 Exhibit by Steven Zwillinger
Forgotten Revenue Paper: Indian Hundis of Edward VII 1903-1910 Exhibit by Steven Zwillinger
India Refugee Relief Tax 1971-73 Exhibit by Ronald J. Klimley
Revenues of Selected Princely States of India till 1950 Exhibit by Jiří Černý
Tax Stamps and Tax Stamp Papers of Indian Feudal State Bonai Exhibit by Jiří Černý
Revenue Stamps of the Princely State of Karauli Exhibit by Jiří Černý
Kishangarh Exhibit by Ajay Mittal
Kishangarh Revenues Exhibit by Abdul Mollah
Revenue Stamps of Vala - India Princely State Exhibit by Jiří Černý

Taxation in India
Philately of India
India